The impunity game is a simple game in experimental economics, similar to the Dictator Game.  

The first player "the proposer" chooses between two possible divisions of some endowment (such as a cash prize):
The first choice will be a very unequal division, giving most of the endowment to herself, and sharing little with the second player (the partner or the "responder"). 
The second choice is a more even division, giving a "fair" proportion of the initial pie to the responder, and keeping the rest for herself.

The second and final move of the game is in the hands of the responder: he can accept or reject the amount offered. Unlike the ultimatum game, this has no effect on the proposer, who always keeps the share she originally awarded herself.

This game has been studied less intensively than the other standards of experimental economics, but appears to produce the interesting result that proposers typically take the "least fair" option, keeping most of the reward for themselves, a conclusion sharply in contrast to that implied by the ultimatum or dictator games.

Notes 

 1998 Bolton, Katok, Zwick, International Journal of Game Theory, for a dictator game comparison.

References 
 Bolton, Gary E., Elena Katok, Rami Zwick. «Dictator game giving: Rules of fairness versus acts of kindness». International Journal of Game Theory 27, n.º 2 (1998): 269-299. 
 Takagishi, Haruto, Taiki Takahashi, Akira Toyomura, Nina Takashino, Michiko Koizumi, Toshio Yamagishi. «Neural Correlates of the Rejection of Unfair Offers in the Impunity Game». Neuro Endocrinology Letters 30, n.o 4 (2009): 496-500. 

Non-cooperative games